Old Surehand  (also known as Flaming Frontier)  is a 1965 German Western film starring Stewart Granger, Pierre Brice and Letitia Roman. The film is based on a novel by Karl May.

It was shot at the Spandau Studios and on location in Yugoslavia, including around Rijeka on the Adriatic. The film's sets were designed by the art director Vladimir Tadej.

It made $1,587,777 in Spain.

Plot
Frontiersman Old Surehand (Stewart Granger) and his faithful friend Old Wabble (Milan Srdoc) are on the trail of a cold-blooded killer with the nickname 'The General' (Larry Pennell), who murdered Old Surehand's brother. On the way Old Surehand and Old Wabble are involved in the running conflict between settlers and the Comanches. Old Surehand can count on the support of his friend and blood brother Winnetou (Pierre Brice), the amiable chief of the Apaches. Bandits commanded by The General rob a train and try to put the blame on the Comanches. When the son of the Comanche chief is killed in town by a sniper, only Old Surehand and Winnetou are able to prevent a war between the Comanches and settlers.

Cast 
 Stewart Granger as Old Surehand
 Pierre Brice as Winnetou
 Larry Pennell as General Jack O’Neil
 Letitia Roman as  Judith
 Wolfgang Lukschy as  Richter Edwards
 Terence Hill as  Toby Spencer
 Erik Schumann as  Captain Miller
 Milan Srdoč as  Old Wabble
 Velimir Bata Živojinović as  Jim Potter
 Voja Mirić as  Joe
 Dušan Janićijević as  Clinch

References

External links
 

1965 films
1965 Western (genre) films
German Western (genre) films
West German films
Winnetou films
Films directed by Alfred Vohrer
Films produced by Horst Wendlandt
Films set in the 19th century
Films set in New Mexico
Films shot in Croatia
Films shot in Slovenia
Films shot in Yugoslavia
Constantin Film films
Yugoslav Western (genre) films
Films shot at Spandau Studios
1960s German films
Foreign films set in the United States